Eileen Margaret Hunt Botting (born 1971) is an American political theorist and professor of political science. She works on political thought from the 17th century to the present. She is a professor at the University of Notre Dame and has published four solo-authored books and edited another five books. In 2021, she returned to publishing with the author name, Eileen M. Hunt, with the essay "Dracula's Daughter: the rediscovery of a love poem for George Orwell" in The TLS.

Biography
Botting, a Maine native, studied English, Philosophy, and Ancient Greek at Bowdoin College. In 1992 she received a Marshall Scholarship to continue her studies in the United Kingdom, where she studied philosophy from 1993 to 1995 at St. John's College, Cambridge. In 2001, she earned her Ph.D. with distinction at Yale University in the Department of Political Science, with a focus on feminist political philosophy and the history of modern political thought.

In 2009 she was the recipient of the Colonial Society of Massachusetts Award from the New England Regional Fellowship Consortium; in 2012, the triennial Edition Award from the Society for the Study of American Women Writers, with Sarah L. Houser, for their scholarly edition of Reminiscences and Traditions of Boston by Hannah Mather Crocker;  in 2014, the Okin-Young award for the best article published in feminist political theory in the previous year; in 2015, an American Council of Learned Societies Fellowship for her project Frankenstein and the Question of Human Development; and in 2019, a recipient of an Alfred P. Sloan Foundation book grant in the Public Understanding of Science, Technology, and Economics Program to support her work on Political Science Fictions after 'Frankenstein': Mary Shelley and the Politics of Making Artificial Life and Intelligence. This is the subject of her fourth solo-authored book, Artificial Life After Frankenstein, published in December 2020. She has also edited the two-volume set, Portraits of Wollstonecraft (2021), for Bloomsbury Philosophy.

Publications

Authored 

Artificial Life After Frankenstein, University of Pennsylvania Press, 2020
Mary Shelley and the Rights of the Child: Political Philosophy in 'Frankenstein''', University of Pennsylvania Press, 2017Wollstonecraft, Mill, and Women's Human Rights, Yale University Press, 2016Family Feuds: Wollstonecraft, Burke, and Rousseau on the Transformation of the Family, The State University of New York Press, 2006

 Edited 

 with Jill Locke, Feminist Interpretations of Alexis de Tocqueville, Penn State, 2009
 with Sarah L. Houser, Reminiscences and Traditions of Boston by Hannah Mather Crocker, NEHGS, 2011
 A Vindication of the Rights of Woman by Mary Wollstonecraft, with new scholarly essays by Virginia Sapiro, Norma Clarke, Ruth Abbey, Eileen Hunt Botting, and Madeline Cronin, Yale University Press, 2014
 with Sandrine Berges and Alan Coffee, The Wollstonecraftian Mind, Routledge, 2019
 Portraits of Wollstonecraft, 2 vols.,'' Bloomsbury Philosophy, 2021

References

1971 births
Living people
Political philosophers
University of Notre Dame faculty
Yale Graduate School of Arts and Sciences alumni
Alumni of the University of Cambridge
Social philosophers
American women philosophers
American women political scientists
American political scientists
Bowdoin College alumni
Marshall Scholars
American expatriates in the United Kingdom
Educators from Maine
American women educators
21st-century American women